The 2017 Eastern Washington Eagles football team represented Eastern Washington University in the 2017 NCAA Division I FCS football season. The team was coached by first-year head coach Aaron Best, who was promoted from Offensive Line coach. The Eagles played their home games at Roos Field in Cheney, Washington and were a member of the Big Sky Conference. They finished the season 7–4, 6–2 in Big Sky play to finish in a three-way tie for third place. Despite being ranked in the top 25 at the end of the regular season, they were not selected to participate in the FCS Playoffs.

Schedule

Source: Schedule

Game summaries

at Texas Tech

North Dakota State

at Fordham

at Montana

Sacramento State

at UC Davis

Montana State

at Southern Utah

Weber State

at North Dakota

Portland State

Ranking movements

References

Eastern Washington
Eastern Washington Eagles football seasons
Eastern Washington Eagles football